The Nanjing World Challenge is a track and field meet at Nanjing Olympic Sports Centre in Nanjing, China. The inaugural edition was held in 2019 as part of the IAAF World Challenge.

Meeting records

Men

Women

References

Athletics competitions in China
Recurring sporting events established in 2019